Clark J. Quinn is a United States Air Force major general serving as assistant deputy commander of the United States Air Forces Central Command and assistant vice commander of the 9th Air Expeditionary Task Force. He previously served as the vice director for strategy, plans, and policy of the United States Central Command and prior to that was the vice commander of the 9th Air and Space Expeditionary Task Force - Afghanistan. In February 2021, he was nominated and confirmed for promotion to major general, which became effective July 6, 2021.

References

External links

Year of birth missing (living people)
Living people
Place of birth missing (living people)
United States Air Force generals